The Trade Union International of Food, Tobacco, Hotel and Allied Industries Workers was a trade union international affiliated with the World Federation of Trade Unions.

History 

The union was founded in 1949 at a conference in Sofia, Bulgaria. Its original name was the Trade Union International of Food, Tobacco and Beverage Industries, and Hotel, Cafe and Restaurant Workers.

In 1997 the Trade Union International of Agroalimentary, Food, Commerce, Textile & Allied Industries was formed by the merger of the Trade Union International of Agricultural, Forestry and Plantation Workers, Trade Union International of Food, Tobacco, Hotel and Allied Industries Workers, Trade Union International of Workers in Commerce, Trade Union International of Textile, Leather and Fur Workers Unions.

Organization 
The TUI was organized with a Congress, directing committee and permanent secretariat. Its headquarters is listed as Positano Street #8, Sofia in early accounts, but was relocated to #4 September 6, Sofia from 1978 until the early 1990s when it was reported at Stamboliyski 3.

Leadership

General Secretaries
1949: Anton Ditchev
c.1960: Elio Moya
Sacho Ivanov
Francisco Castillo
1980s: Luis Martell Rosa

Presidents
1949: Maurice Simonin
1956: Vincenzo Ansanelli

1979: Andre Nogier
1980s: Bertrand Page

References 

Trade unions established in 1949
Trade unions disestablished in 1997
Food
Organizations based in Sofia
1949 establishments in Bulgaria
Defunct transnational trade unions
TUI of Agriculture, Food, Commerce, Textile and Allied Industries